Linen is a textile made from the fibers of the flax plant, Linum usitatissimum.

Linen or linens may also refer to:

 Linen, a shade of the color white
 Linen clothes
 Linen-press, a type of cabinet
 Linens, fabric household goods and clothing items
 Linens 'n Things, an online retailer